Granovetter is a surname. Notable people with the surname include:

Mark Granovetter (born 1943), American academic
Matt Granovetter (born 1950), American bridge player